XXV: The Essential is a compilation album written and mostly performed by Mike Oldfield and released in 1997. The Roman numerals XXV are to represent that this is a compilation of pieces of the first 25 years of Oldfield's work.

Background 
The 14-track album features songs from the first 25 years of Oldfield's career, when he was on the Virgin Records and Warner Music labels.

Oldfield's version of "Women of Ireland" although from his previous album of new material, "Voyager", was released as a single from this compilation album in 1997 and titled "Women of Ireland XXV".

The track "Tubular Bells III" is an early version of the main introduction theme ("Source of Secrets") from Oldfield's then forthcoming album, Tubular Bells III. The differences between this version and the album version are there is a male vocal instead of a female vocal and there is different instrumentation.

Track listing 
 "Tubular Bells" (Excerpt) – 4:16
 "Hergest Ridge" (Excerpt) – 4:54
 "Ommadawn" (Excerpt) – 6:57
 "Incantations" (Excerpt) – 4:38
 "Moonlight Shadow" – 3:35
 "Portsmouth" – 2:00
 "Good News" (from The Killing Fields) – 1:44
 "Sentinel" (Single remix) (from Tubular Bells II) – 3:56
 "The Bell" (Remix) – 3:06
 "Let There Be Light" – 4:19
 "Only Time Will Tell" – 4:25
 "The Voyager" – 4:22
 "Women of Ireland" – 6:27
 "Tubular Bells III" (Excerpt) – 3:40

Certifications

References

External links 
 Mike Oldfield discography - XXV at Tubular.net

1997 greatest hits albums
Mike Oldfield compilation albums
Warner Music Group compilation albums
Virgin Records compilation albums